is a Japanese manga series written and illustrated by Kazuhiko Shimamoto. It was serialized in the Shogakukan manga magazine Weekly Shōnen Sunday from 1983 to 1985. Honō no Tenkōsei was adapted into a two-episode original video animation (OVA) anime series in 1991 by Gainax. A live-action series, titled Blazing Transfer Students, premiered on Netflix in 2017.

Plot
Noboru Takizawa transfers to a school where all disputes are settled through fighting. He quickly runs afoul of the school bully, Saburō Ibuki, who has a boxing match with "God's Hall Monitor", Kōichi Jōnouchi, to determine who will date the lovely Yukari. Takizawa is enraptured with Yukari, and decides to intervene in the fight which Ibuki won by bending the rules. Takizawa loses the fight in the first OVA to Ibuki's deadly finishing punch, but in the second OVA Takizawa develops his own finishing punch and eventually wins the day.

Characters
 
 
 
 
 
 
 
 
 
  (credited as Schoolboy A)
 
  (credited as Schoolboy C)

Media

Manga
Honō no Tenkōsei, written and illustrated by Kazuhiko Shimamoto, was serialized in the Shogakukan magazine Weekly Shōnen Sunday from July 20, 1983, to November 13, 1985. The individual chapters were collected in twelve tankōbon volumes, released from February 18, 1984, to January 18, 1986.

OVA
Honō no Tenkōsei was adapted into a two-episode original video animation (OVA) anime produced by Gainax. The anime reunites director Katsuhiko Nishijima and character designer Yuji Moriyama of the original Project A-ko and features storyboards by Sumio Watanabe. The OVA features an opening vocal theme written by Shimamoto Kazuhiko, arranged by Kohei Tanaka, and performed by Toshihiko Seki. The ending theme, was composed and arranged by Tanaka and performed by Noriko Hidaka. The Honō no Tenkōsei OVA parodies anime of the 1970s, particularly Tomorrow's Joe, and is complete with intentionally jerky animation, dirty-looking cels, thick black lines, and retro character designs, much like Shimamoto's drawing style.

According to Chris Beveridge of The Fandom Post Honō no Tenkōsei was released on both VHS and laserdisc, but not DVD. It was released on Blu-ray by Pony Canyon on March 19, 2014.

Live-action series
A Netflix original live-action series called Blazing Transfer Students or Honō no Tenkōsei REBORN was released as a sequel set years after the original story. The story revolves around seven students all named Kakeru who transfer into the school. It was released on November 10, 2017, and was directed by Toshio Lee.

Reception
As of March 2017, the manga had over 1.6 million copies in circulation.

Anime News Network's Justin Sevakis, commenting on the anime, said that "while the animation has that slightly soft shot-on-film look, the heightened contrast and angular designs that were meant to evoke the past have instead kept it looking modern."

References

External links

1991 anime OVAs
Gainax
Japanese-language Netflix original programming
Kazuhiko Shimamoto
Parody anime and manga
Pony Canyon
Shogakukan franchises
Shogakukan manga
Shōnen manga
Sports anime and manga